Bismuna Raya Lagoon Natural Reserve is a nature reserve in Nicaragua. It is one of the 78 reserves that are under official protection in the country.

See also
Tourism in Nicaragua

Protected areas of Nicaragua